Tapuae-o-Uenuku, formerly Mount Tapuaenuku, is the highest peak in the northeast of New Zealand's South Island. The name translates from Māori as "footprint of the rainbow", though is usually regarded as being named after Chief Tapuaenuku.

At  it is the highest mountain in New Zealand outside the main ranges of the Southern Alps / Kā Tiritiri o te Moana, and over 80 metres taller than Mount Ruapehu, the tallest peak in the North Island.

It dominates the Inland Kaikōura Range, rising high above the valleys of the Waiau Toa / Clarence and Awatere Rivers. It can be seen from as far away as the Kapiti Coast in the North Island, nearly 165 kilometres away, and is a prominent point on the horizon for travellers on the interisland ferries that ply Cook Strait.

The first European to sight the mountain was James Cook, who called it Mount Odin, but later nicknamed it "The Watcher" since his ship seemed to be visible from it at so many points along the coast. The first Europeans to attempt to climb the mountain were Edward John Eyre, Lieutenant-Governor of New Munster, and William John Warburton Hamilton, in 1849. They came within a short distance of the summit but were forced to turn back.

Tappy, as the locals call it, was the springboard for legendary mountaineer Sir Edmund Hillary's climbing career that took him to be the first person to reach the summit of Mt Everest.

"I'd climbed a decent mountain at last," Sir Ed said of his weekend solo climb in 1944, while training with the Royal New Zealand Air Force in Marlborough during WW2.

See also
 List of mountains of New Zealand by height

Notes

External links 
  Tapuae-o-Uenuku at PeakBagger.com
   Tapuae-o-Uenuku at theprow.org.nz

Tapuae-o-Uenuku
Kaikōura District